Duff Wilson is an American investigative reporter, formerly with The New York Times, later with Reuters. He is the first two-time winner of the Harvard University Goldsmith Prize for Investigative Reporting, a two-time winner of the George Polk Award, and a three-time finalist for the Pulitzer Prize.

Education
Wilson graduated from Western Washington University in 1976, and from the Columbia University Graduate School of Journalism in 1982.

Career
He has worked for The Seattle Times, The New York Times and Reuters and has served on the board of Investigative Reporters and Editors. Since 2010 he has taught investigative reporting at the Columbia University Graduate School of Journalism. Wilson joined The New York Times in 2004. During his time there, Wilson covered topics such as pharmaceutical and tobacco industries along with sports-related investigations, mainly steroids. One article he wrote about the Duke Lacrosse Case garnered criticism, as the case unraveled. Prior to working for The Times, he worked as an investigative projects reporter for The Seattle Times since 1989. Before working here, he worked for the Seattle Post-Intelligencer and the Associated Press. At the Seattle PI, Wilson wrote that paper's story about Gary Little. Wilson is also a webmaster of Reporter's Desktop.

Family
Wilson's father and brother published a weekly newspaper in Washington. He has two children with Barbara Wilson, a high school teacher.

Works

Awards and honors
1998; 2002 Goldsmith Prize for Investigative Reporting
2001; 2003 George Polk Award for medical and local reporting
2002 Gerald Loeb Award for Large Newspapers
2002 Heywood Broun Award
May 2012 Sidney Award
2003; 2002; 1998 three time Pulitzer finalist
Public-service awards from the Associated Press Managing Editors and the Newspaper Guild
2002; Book-of-the-year honors from IRE for his book Fateful Harvest: The True Story of a Small Town, a Global Industry, and a Toxic Secret
USACBL champion

References

External links
"New FDA Regulations Could Change Smokers' Habits", NPR, April 22, 2010
Journalist's blog
Journalist's twitter
http://www.reporter.org/desktop/rd/duffbio.htm

American male journalists
George Polk Award recipients
The New York Times writers
Western Washington University alumni
Columbia University Graduate School of Journalism alumni
Living people
1950s births
20th-century American journalists
Gerald Loeb Award winners for Large Newspapers